The Rhino  (Aleksei Sytsevich; English: Ah-lek-say sit-seh-vich; Russian: Алексей Сицевич) is a fictional character appearing in American comic books published by Marvel Comics. He was created by writer Stan Lee and artist John Romita Sr., and first appeared in The Amazing Spider-Man #41 (Oct. 1966). The character is a Russian thug who underwent an experimental procedure that gave him an artificial skin covering and superhuman strength. Rebelling against the scientists responsible for his transformation, Rhino used his newfound powers to become a successful criminal, and soon clashed with superheroes like Spider-Man and the Hulk. The character is typically portrayed as a dimwitted brute, capable of great destruction, but ultimately easily deceived.

One of Spider-Man's most prominent adversaries, the Rhino has been adapted into various forms of media since his original debut during the Silver Age of Comic Books, including animated television series and video games. He has also featured in Marvel merchandise such as action figures and trading cards.

Paul Giamatti played a version of Aleksei Sytsevich who uses a rhinoceros-themed battle armor, similar to the character's Ultimate Marvel incarnation, in the 2014 film The Amazing Spider-Man 2.

Publication history
Described by writer Mike Conroy as "famously one of Spider-Man's dimmest villains", the Rhino debuted in The Amazing Spider-Man #41–43 (Oct.–Dec. 1966) as a thug for hire working for an Eastern Bloc country. He volunteers to participate in an experiment that bonds a super-strong polymer to his skin, as well as augmenting his strength and speed. The character returned in The Incredible Hulk (vol. 2) #104 (June 1968), and although he apparently died at the end of the story, he was revived in The Incredible Hulk (vol. 2) #124 (Feb. 1970), becoming a perennial opponent of both Spider-Man and the Hulk.

The character achieved significant exposure in the 1980s and 1990s, appearing in both a solo capacity and as a villain for hire in over 12 titles. Significant appearances included starring in the limited series Deadly Foes of Spider-Man #1–4 (May–Aug. 1991); the "Flowers for Rhino" storyline in Spider-Man's Tangled Web #5–6 (Oct.–Nov. 2001), which is told from the character's perspective; and Punisher War Journal (vol. 2) #13–15 (Jan.–March 2008), in which Rhino begins to rethink his lifestyle. He has also been a member of multiple supervillain teams, including the Emissaries of Evil, the Sinister Syndicate, and the Sinister Six.

Fictional character biography

Origin and early villainy 
Aleksei Sytsevich was a member of the Russian mafia who willingly underwent a series of chemical and radiation treatments meant to give him an artificial skin covering that would grant superhuman strength. After successfully completing the treatment, Sytsevich rebelled against the Eastern Bloc agents who gave him these powers, destroying their laboratory. He was subsequently hired to kidnap Colonel John Jameson and obtain the extraterrestrial spores to which Jameson was exposed during a space mission, but Sytsevich was defeated by the superhero Spider-Man and taken to prison.

After serving his sentence, the Rhino was approached by the same scientists for more augmentation. This time, they used the same gamma radiation that granted the Hulk his abilities to further increase the Rhino's strength. They also equipped him with a more durable, acid-proof suit that would further increase his abilities. The Rhino agreed to find and kidnap Bruce Banner, the Hulk's human alter ego, for his knowledge of gamma radiation. Despite the Rhino's training and equipment, he was easily defeated by the Hulk, who placed him in a coma.

Months later, the Rhino was revived by the Leader, who planned to interrupt Banner's wedding to Betty Ross. The Leader intended to transform Banner into the Hulk, and wanted the Rhino to protect him from the ensuing rampage. At the wedding, the Rhino betrays the Leader and attacks Banner the moment he transforms. In the resulting chaos, the Rhino is once again comatose, and the Leader briefly takes mental control of Sytsevich's body to combat the Hulk. The Leader abandons the Rhino and the Hulk on an alien world, and return home in a rocket, which crashes on arrival.

The Rhino's first collaboration with other villains occurs when he and the Abomination activated a gamma bomb at the Hulkbuster base in an attempt to destroy the Hulk. Although this attempt failed, Egghead recruited the Rhino for his supervillain team, the Emissaries of Evil, where he was paired with Solarr in search of a rare jewel. Rhino and Solarr are defeated by the Defenders, Doctor Strange, and Doc Samson.

Samson took the Rhino to Project P.E.G.A.S.U.S., where he was part of a failed prison break involving Moonstone, Blackout, and Electro. While being transferred to another facility, the Miracle Man attempted to free the Rhino, who wanted to stay in P.E.G.A.S.U.S. for medical treatment. The rocket crash had permanently affixed the Rhino's costume to his body, and he wanted it separated. He and the Thing successfully stopped Miracle Man, and took the Rhino to a medical facility within P.E.G.A.S.U.S.

When the treatments fail to return the Rhino to normal, he escapes P.E.G.A.S.U.S. and joins the Sinister Syndicate, fighting Spider-Man on multiple occasions. After the team falls apart, the Rhino is hired by the Kingpin under the belief that he can raise the money for more surgery. When he hears the Kingpin tell a group of scientists not to remove the Rhino suit, Sytsevich kidnaps one of their children until they complete the procedure. Sytsevich then requests a removable suit from Justin Hammer, allowing him to continue his life of crime.

Hulk in the bandaged disguise of "Bob Danner" played baseball for the Florida Pistols when they competed against the Miami Emperors. One player on the Miami Emperors turns out to be Rhino under the alias of "Alex O'Hirn". A fight soon happened between both teams where the baseball players soon left the field when they found out how strong "Bob Danner" and "Alex O'Hirn" are.

Rhino was among the villains who accompany Klaw in his invasion of Wakanda. It took the Wakandan Air Force to subdue Rhino.

Civil War and aftermath
When the Rhino accidentally kills a security guard during a bank robbery, he is humiliated by the Punisher, and captured by Alyosha Kravinoff, the son of Kraven the Hunter. The Punisher rescues the Rhino from Kravinoff's superhuman zoo, and he is convinced to make amends. The Rhino sends a letter and money to the security guard's widow, and aids the Punisher on a case. Later, the Rhino persuades the Punisher not to kill Michael Watts, the third Stilt-Man.

During The Gauntlet storyline, the Rhino gives up his life of crime, surrendering himself to the police. S.H.I.E.L.D. removes his Rhino suit and sentences him to 25 years on Ryker's Island. He is released early on good behavior, and upon release, he meets Doctor Tramma, who wants to reinvent the Rhino. Sytsevich declines, and Tramma creates a new Rhino. At Spider-Man's persuasion, Sytsevich refuses to fight the new Rhino. That promise is broken when Sytsevich's wife Oksana is killed, and a grief-stricken Sytsevich kills the new Rhino.

Doctor Octopus recruits the Rhino for his iteration of the Sinister Six. During the Ends of the Earth storyline, the Rhino tells Spider-Man that the loss of his wife has changed him, and he is prepared to die. When Doctor Octopus self-destructs his own lair, the Rhino pins Silver Sable to the floor of a flooding corridor, knowing that Spider-Man will blame himself for his fellow hero's death. He is presumed drowned, and while in Doctor Octopus' dying body, Spider-Man meets Oksana and the Rhino in the afterlife.

All-New, All-Different Marvel 
As part of the lead-up to the Dead No More: The Clone Conspiracy storyline, the Rhino resurfaces, having survived his apparent demise. The Jackal finds Sytsevich in hiding in Tahuexco, Guatemala, where he persuades the Rhino to do his bidding with the promise of a revived Oksana. When Doctor Octopus activates a virus in all of the Jackal's clones that causes them to rapidly decay, Oksana turns to dust, and the Rhino goes on a grief-stricken rampage. Spider-Man calms him by convincing him to move forward for his wife's sake, and the two agree to see each other once in a while to help the other with their pain.

In a prelude to the "Hunted" storyline, the Rhino is among the animal-themed characters captured by the Taskmaster and the Black Ant on behalf of Kraven the Hunter. He is among those who Arcade publicly reveals as the Savage Six.

During the "King in Black" storyline, Rhino is among the villains recruited by Mayor Wilson Fisk to be part of his Thunderbolts at the time of Knull's invasion. Following the deaths of Ampere and Snakehead, Taskmaster couldn't bring himself to prevent Rhino from walking away.

During the "Sinister War" storyline, Rhino accompanied the Savage Six into attacking the premiere of the movie which Mysterio was involved in. This led up to the Savage Six also fighting the Sinister Six.

During the "Devil's Reign" storyline, Rhino appears as a member of Mayor Wilson Fisk's latest incarnation of the Thunderbolts when Mayor Fisk passes a law that forbids superhero activities. He assisted Agony, Electro II, and U.S. Agent in taking down Moon Knight. In truth, Rhino did not signing up to dispose underage superheroes after learning the Kamala's Law incidents in Outlawed and its conclusion in Killer App, so he secretly helps the Champions by giving them the Thunderbolts badge due to Fisk's patrol system becoming even tighter with Doctor Octopus' Octobots and many innocent people being unsaved. It was because of Rhino declaring himself out of the Thunderbolts because of this reason that caused Mayor Fisk to bring in Abomination as a replacement.

Powers, abilities, and equipment
A series of mutagenic chemical and radiation treatments provide the Rhino with unnatural strength, stamina, durability, and speed, all which were further augmented by even more gamma rays. His incredible speed allows him to run at high velocities, especially over short distances. Sytsevich frequently "charges" his opponents in this manner, enabling him to cause great harm to most enemies in the surrounding area. He is, however, notorious for his lack of agility and slow reaction time, which makes it difficult for him to change direction when running at high speeds. As such, his fighting style is focused more on melee attacks.

Rhino suit
Sytsevich possesses a thick polymer suit that resembles the physique of a rhinoceros, including two horns, and covers everything but his face. The suit is resistant to damage and extreme temperatures and these horns are capable of penetrating two-inch plate steel. His first, cruder suit was originally bonded to his skin in the aftermath of a rocket crash and he went through several attempts to have the suit removed.

After the first suit's destruction, Justin Hammer created a second, removable iteration. The second suit allows Sytsevich to withstand high caliber bullets, thermal attacks, and most impact forces. It also further increases his strength and durability.

Other characters named Rhino

Doctor Tramma's Rhino
When Aleksei Sytsevich declines Doctor Tramma's offer to return to the Rhino role, Tramma finds another subject and equips him with a high-tech suit that was supposed to be given to Sytsevich. The second Rhino comes after Sytsevich, feeling that he had to destroy the original Rhino if he was going to ascend. Spider-Man defeats the second Rhino, who then escapes.

While lifting a makeshift dumbbell made out of a pole and two trucks, the second Rhino is called up by a mysterious person telling him where he can find Sytsevich. Rhino attacks Aleksei at one of J. Jonah Jameson's press meetings. Aleksei lies to the second Rhino, agreeing to fight him in his Rhino suit, but instead goes into hiding with his wife Oksana. Before they arrive at their safehouse, however, the second Rhino attacks again, and Oksana dies as a result. Aleksei dons his old Rhino suit, which is strong enough to destroy the new Rhino's, and kills the unnamed wearer.

Reception
 In 2020, CBR.com ranked Rhino 2nd in their "10 Most Powerful Members of the Sinister Syndicate" list.
 In 2022, Screen Rant ranked Rhino 8th in their "10 Most Powerful Silk Villains In Marvel Comics" list.

Other versions

Age of Apocalypse
In the alternate reality depicted in the 1995 Age of Apocalypse storyline, the Rhino was one of those superhumans captured by the horseman Death. He was brought to the Ship, Apocalypse's recovery base, and was transformed into a powerful monster by the Terrigen Mist. While on the Ship, the Rhino joined Death and his other henchmen in fighting Magneto and the X-Men, where he was incapacitated by Rogue.

Amazing Spider-Man: Renew Your Vows
During the "Secret Wars" storyline in the pages of Amazing Spider-Man: Renew Your Vows, the Rhino works as an enforcer of the Regent. He is first seen alongside Boomerang and the Shocker, assaulting Demolition Man for protesting against the Regent's rules. Following the deaths of Doctor Octopus and the Hobgoblin, and the incapacitation of the Vulture, the Regent recruits the Rhino, Boomerang, and the Beetle for the Sinister Six. As part of the Sinister Six, the Rhino attacks S.H.I.E.L.D.'s secret base after the Regent probes the Sandman's mind.

Earth-Charnel
The Rhino was seen as a member of the Avengers of Earth-9939, who travelled through time to stop the entity known as Charnel. After being partnered with She-Hulk for 20 years, both were killed in action.

House of M
In the alternate reality seen in the 2005 House of M storyline, the Rhino serves as the bodyguard of Peter Parker. Parker sends the Rhino to question Crusher Hogan, a wrestler performing under the name "the Green Goblin," and Sytsevich hospitalizes Hogan. Now in hiding from the authorities, the Rhino is approached by the Green Goblin, who is looking for allies in defeating Parker. The Rhino performs a double-cross and enlists his friends Electro, the Ox and the Vulture to attack the Green Goblin, unmasking him to reveal Peter Parker.

JLA/Avengers
In the third issue of the 2003 JLA/Avengers crossover miniseries, the Rhino was among the villains enthralled by Krona to defend his stronghold. He is briefly seen defeating Triathlon in battle.

Marvel Zombies
The Rhino, a member of the undead Sinister Six, was among the zombified villains that attempted to devour Galactus. When the other zombies finished eating Galactus, zombified versions of the Hulk and Spider-Man dismembered and ate the Rhino, both stating that he tasted poor.

MC2
In Mr. and Mrs. Spider-Man, within the Marvel Comics 2 universe, the Rhino briefly loses his temper while visiting the hospital with his sick aunt. After calming down, the Rhino waits in line and comes face to face with Peter Parker, who is with his own family. They discuss their superhero pasts and call a truce, with Sytsevich assuring Peter that what he did was simply business. They spend the remainder of Peter's visit exchanging stories, and part with a better understanding of one another.

Spider-Verse
In the Spider-Verse storyline, the Earth-001 version of the Rhino appears as a member of Verna's Hounds. He accompanies Verna and the Earth-001 version of the Scorpion to Earth-21205 to hunt that world's Peter Parker, masquerading as the Hobgoblin, where they were stopped by the Spider-Woman of Earth-65. He later helps Verna and the Earth-001 versions of Hammerhead and the Ox attack the Spider-Totems on Earth-8847. The Earth-001 Rhino is killed by the Superior Spider-Man, the Assassin Spider-Man, and Spider Punk.

Marvel Mangaverse
A member of the Kishi Kuri clan, the Rhino was present when Venom usurped the Kingpin, and was later seen battling the Shadow Clan.

Spider-Gwen
On Earth-65, Aleksei Sytsevich is a mercenary hired by the Kingpin and Matt Murdock to kill Captain George Stacy. Although he does not appear as the Rhino, Aleksei is depicted as a large man with gray skin and blue hair. After being stopped by the Spider-Woman, Officer Frank Castle interrogates Sytsevich about who ordered the hit on Stacy. Castle beats the information out of Sytsevich that the Kingpin was the one responsible.

Old Man Logan
In the Old Man Logan universe, where villains rose to power, the Rhino left Manhattan to form the Rhino Gang. The Gang successfully conquered Arizona and New Mexico, killing anyone that stood in their way. When they reached a Cheyenne reservation in South Dakota, the Gang met resistance in the form of Forge and his high-tech defenses. Forge annihilated the Rhino Gang before beating the Rhino to death.

Ultimate Marvel
The Ultimate Marvel version of the Rhino is Alex O'Hirn, a scientist who uses a suit of armor known as R.H.I.N.O. (Robotism Heuristic Intelligence Navigable Operative), stolen from the United States military. Using the armor's strength, O'Hirn robs a Manhattan bank by charging the vault-head first. He then rampages through a busy city street. The original Spider-Man tries to escape school to confront O'Hirn, but cannot get there in time. By the time he catches up with R.H.I.N.O., Spider-Man found that he was defeated by Iron Man.

In the "Divided We Fall" arc, Miles Morales uses his venom blasts to create a shortcut into the R.H.I.N.O. armor.

In other media

Television
 The Rhino appears in Spider-Man (1967), voiced by Ed McNamara.
 The Rhino appears in Spider-Man: The Animated Series, voiced by Don Stark. He first appears in the three-part episode "The Alien Costume", as an employee of the Kingpin. In the episodes "The Insidious Six" and "Battle of the Insidious Six", the Rhino joins the titular team.
 The Alex O'Hirn incarnation of the Rhino appears in The Spectacular Spider-Man, voiced by Clancy Brown. Originally a common thug under Tombstone and Flint Marko's partner in crime, he was used as a guinea pig in Norman Osborn's illegal experiments, wherein O'Hirn became infused with Dr. Otto Octavius' titanium resin armor. Christening himself the Rhino, his armor makes him physically powerful, but it obstructs his pores, forcing him to periodically stop and re-hydrate. Following his first fight with Spider-Man, the Rhino goes on to join two incarnations of the Sinister Six before he is eventually captured.
 The Alex O'Hirn incarnation of the Rhino appears in Ultimate Spider-Man, voiced by Max Mittelman and Daryl Sabara respectively. This version is a teenager who uses a serum to transform into an anthropomorphic rhinoceros rather than don battle armor. After his self-titled introductory episode, the Rhino joins the Sinister Six in the group's self-titled episode until Spider-Man eventually persuades him to join the S.H.I.E.L.D. Academy and use his powers for good. However, Doctor Octopus puts the Rhino under mind-control in the fourth season until Spider-Man finds a way to revert the latter back to his human form in the series finale.
 The Aleksei Sytsevich incarnation of the Rhino appears in Spider-Man (2017), voiced primarily by Matthew Mercer, and briefly voiced by Ben Pronsky in "Dead Man's Party". This version is a Russian student at Horizon High who is secretly injected with Rhino serum by Raymond Warren. While in his Rhino form, he has poor eyesight like an actual rhinoceros.
 The Rhino appears in Spidey and His Amazing Friends, voiced by Justin Shenkarow.
 The Rhino will appear in Spider-Man: Freshman Year.

Film
 The Aleksei Sytsevich incarnation of the Rhino appears in The Amazing Spider-Man 2, portrayed by Paul Giamatti. In an interview with visual-effects supervisor Jerome Chen, he states that the armor was "put together out of surplus Soviet-era military gear that Oscorp had sold back in the '80s", with Sytsevich modifying the armor further. This version of Sytsevich is a dim-witted and boastful member of the Russian mafia. After being foiled by Spider-Man while attempting to steal Oscorp plutonium and being incarcerated, Gustav Fiers grants Sytsevich a rhinoceros-themed mech suit armed with heavy machine guns and missile launchers. Following a shootout with the police, he is confronted by Spider-Man and engages him in combat.
 Paul Giamatti confirmed that the Rhino was planned to return in a third The Amazing Spider-Man film before the franchise was cancelled.

Video games
 The Rhino appears in Spider-Man (2000), voiced by Dee Bradley Baker.
 The Rhino appears as a boss in the Spider-Man 2 (2004), voiced by John DiMaggio. This version's suit possesses spikes and claws.
 The Alex O'Hirn incarnation of the R.H.I.N.O. appears as a boss in Ultimate Spider-Man, voiced by Bob Glouberman.
 The Rhino appears as a mini-boss in Marvel: Ultimate Alliance, voiced by Peter Lurie. This version is a member of Doctor Doom's Masters of Evil.
 The Rhino appears as a boss in Spider-Man 3, voiced by Steve Blum. This version has a condition that causes his skin to resemble an actual rhinoceros and wears a helmet resembling that of his traditional costume.
 The Rhino appears as a boss and playable character in Spider-Man: Friend or Foe, voiced again by John DiMaggio.
 The Rhino appears as an assist character in Spider-Man: Web of Shadows, voiced by Fred Tatasciore. Additionally, he appears as a boss in the PS2 and PSP versions.
 The Rhino appears in the Nintendo DS version of Spider-Man: Edge of Time, voiced again by Fred Tatasciore. This version takes Anti-Venom's place as the one who is inadvertently fused with Alchemax scientist Walker Sloan and Doctor Octopus to become the monstrous Atrocity (also voiced by Tatasciore).
 The Rhino appears as a boss in The Amazing Spider-Man film tie-in game, voiced again by Fred Tatasciore. This version is a genetic hybrid of a man and a rhinoceros created by a corrupt Oscorp scientist using gene-splicing technology to sell to a Russian crime syndicate as a living weapon. The Rhino also appears as a playable character in the Rhino Challenge DLC pack.
 The Rhino appears as a playable character in Lego Marvel Super Heroes, voiced by Robin Atkin Downes.
 The Aleksei Sytsevich incarnation of the Rhino appears as a boss in the mobile version of The Amazing Spider-Man 2 film tie-in game, voiced again by Robin Atkin Downes. This version is initially a small-time criminal before donning rhinoceros-themed armor. The Rhino armor from the film also appears as an Easter egg in the other versions of the game.
 The Rhino appears in Marvel Strike Force as a member of the Sinister Six.

Marvel's Spider-Man
The Aleksei Sytsevich incarnation of the Rhino appears in Insomniac's Marvel's Spider-Man series, voiced once again by Fred Tatasciore. This version is a former enforcer for the Russian mafia clad in an experimental and irremovable rhinoceros-themed combat suit that increases his strength. Within the games' continuity, Spider-Man has been a superhero for eight years and is well-familiar with the Rhino, having fought him several times in the past.
 The Rhino first appears as a boss in Spider-Man (2018). At the beginning of the game, he is imprisoned in the Raft, but is later broken out by Otto Octavius and joins his Sinister Six in exchange for Octavius removing his armor. After defeating Spider-Man, the Sinister Six split up to attack various Oscorp properties, with the Rhino later reluctantly working with the Scorpion until they are defeated by Spider-Man and returned to police custody.
 The Rhino returns as a boss in Spider-Man: Miles Morales. Following a failed escape attempt amidst a prison transfer to the Raft, he ends up Roxxon's custody. After receiving new armor, the company recruits him to capture the new Spider-Man and the Tinkerer, only to be defeated by the pair and severely wounded by the latter.

Miscellaneous
 The Rhino appears in Spider-Man: The Darkest Hours, by Jim Butcher. After being forced to ally with Spider-Man against Morlun's family, the two foes gain a deeper respect for one another.
 The Rhino appears in Marvel Universe Live! as a member of the Sinister Six.

Merchandise
 The Rhino received several action figures in Toy Biz's Spider-Man: The Animated Series tie-in line, Spider-Man Classics, and Marvel Legends series. The Spider-Man Classics figure was later repainted and reissued by Hasbro.
 The Rhino received a mini-bust form from Art Asylum as part of their Rogues Gallery collection, and 
 The Rhino received a bust and statue from Bowen Designs.
 The Rhino received a comiquette statue from Sideshow Collectibles.

References

External links
 Rhino at Marvel.com

Action film villains
Villains in animated television series
Characters created by John Romita Sr.
Characters created by Stan Lee
Comics characters introduced in 1966
Fictional characters with slowed ageing
Fictional characters with superhuman durability or invulnerability
Fictional henchmen
Fictional Russian people
Fictional Soviet people
Marvel Comics characters who can move at superhuman speeds
Marvel Comics characters with superhuman strength
Marvel Comics mutates
Marvel Comics supervillains
Spider-Man characters
Video game bosses